The Kaxixó are an indigenous population, located mainly in the Martinho Campos as well as the Pompéu municipalities of the state of Minas Gerais, Brazil.  There are approximately 480 Kaxixó, who are dispersed over a wide area around the Kaxixó aldeia (village).  The Kaxixó mostly work as field hands and servants for landholders.

The Kaxixó are currently not recognized by the Brazilian government.  They have been seeking recognition over the past decades, although local land holders have opposed this recognition.  The Kaxixó claim the farm owners oppose Kaxixó recognition because recognition will give the Kaxixó more leverage with the local farm owners they work for.

Further reading
Warren, Jonathan W. (2001), Racial Revolutions: Antiracism and Indian Resurgence in Brazil.  Duke University Press 

Indigenous peoples in Brazil
Indigenous peoples of Eastern Brazil